Prieto River may refer to:

Prieto River (Lares, Puerto Rico), where Spanish soldiers drowned in 1898
Prieto River (Maricao, Puerto Rico)
Prieto River (Naguabo, Puerto Rico)
Prieto River (Ponce, Puerto Rico), a tributary of the Cerrillos River
Prieto River (Yabucoa, Puerto Rico)